Muslingodden is a headland at the western side of Nordfjorden in Oscar II Land, Spitsbergen. It has a length of about 1.5 kilometer, formed by the moraine of the glacier Sveabreen. The bay Yoldiabukta is located south of Muslingodden.

References

Headlands of Spitsbergen